The Victoria State Government, also referred to as just the Victorian Government, is the state-level authority for Victoria, Australia. Like all state governments, it is formed by three independent branches: the executive, the judicial, and the parliament.

As a parliamentary constitutional monarchy, the State Government was first formed in 1851 when Victoria first gained the right to responsible government. The Constitution of Australia regulates the relationship between the Victorian Government and the Australian Government, and cedes legislative and judicial supremacy to the federal government on conflicting matters.

The Victoria State Government enforces acts passed by the parliament through government departments, statutory authorities, and other public agencies. The Government is formally presided over by the Governor, who exercises executive authority granted by the state's constitution through the Executive Council, a body consisting of senior cabinet ministers. In reality, both the governor and the Executive Council are largely ceremonial, with the premier and ministers having control over policy, appointments, and other executive orders made by the Governor.

The current head of government is Premier Daniel Andrews of the Labor Party, and the current head of state is Governor Linda Dessau.

Executive branch

The Government of Victoria operates under the principles of the Westminster system as adapted in the Australian Constitution and of responsible government. Both systems and principles of governance have developed out of the United Kingdom, to which Victoria was previously a colony.

Executive power rests formally with the Executive Council, which consists of the governor and senior ministers. In practice, executive power is exercised by the premier, appointed by the governor, provided they can command the support of a majority of members of the Legislative Assembly. The Cabinet is the de facto chief policy making organ and consists of the premier and all ministers.

Legislative branch

Legislative power rests with the Parliament of Victoria, which consists of Charles III, King of Australia, represented by the Governor of Victoria, and the two Houses, the Victorian Legislative Council (the upper house) and the Victorian Legislative Assembly (the lower house).

Judicial power

Judicial power is exercised by the Supreme Court of Victoria and a system of subordinate courts, but the High Court of Australia and other federal courts have overriding jurisdiction on matters which fall under the ambit of the Australian Constitution.

First Peoples' Assembly of Victoria 

In November 2019, the First People's Assembly of Victoria was elected, consisting of 21 members representing Aboriginal Victorians, elected from five different regions in the state, and 10 members to represent each of the state's formally recognised traditional owner corporations, excluding the Yorta Yorta Nation Aboriginal Corporation, who declined to participate in the election process.

The main aim of the Assembly is to work out the rules by which individual treaties will be negotiated between the Victoria State Government and individual Aboriginal peoples. It will also establish an independent "umpire", the Treaty Authority, to oversee the negotiations between the Aboriginal groups and the Victoria State Government and ensure fairness. It will also establish a fund to help negotiations are take place on an even financial footing among the various groups, and debate and decide which ideas, laws, policies and rights will be the subject of treaty negotiations.

The Assembly meets in the chamber of the Upper House, seat of the Legislative Council. It met for the first time on 10 December 2019, and again met over two days in February 2020. The Assembly hopes to agree upon a framework, umpire and process before November 2022, the date of the next state election. The current Labor government under Daniel Andrews is supportive, but the Coalition had not made a clear commitment to supporting the treaty process.

On 11 July 2020, the Victoria State Government announced that it would establish a truth and reconciliation commission for Aboriginal Australians in Victoria, the first ever in Australia, with the terms of reference to be worked out collaboratively. The 21 elected members of the Assembly would consult with their communities and work with the Victoria State Government to design the process. The announcement was welcomed by the community. The 2017 Uluru Statement from the Heart recommended that such a commission should be established across all of Australia.

On 3 August 2020, the Assembly held its first official negotiation meeting with Aboriginal Affairs Minister Gabrielle Williams.

See also

 Second Andrews Ministry, the current Cabinet formation
 List of Victorian government agencies
 Local government areas of Victoria
 Victorian Charter of Human Rights and Responsibilities (2006)

References

External links